Tripterodendron is a genus of flowering plants belonging to the family Sapindaceae.

Its native range is Southeastern Brazil.

Species:
 Tripterodendron filicifolium Radlk.

References

Sapindaceae
Sapindaceae genera